Terry Cooke (born 21 February 1962) is a Welsh footballer, who played as a forward in the Football League for Chester.

References

Chester City F.C. players
1962 births
Living people
Colwyn Bay F.C. players
English Football League players
Association football forwards
Footballers from Wrexham
Welsh footballers